Kadhal Desam is a 1996 Indian Tamil-language action romance film written and directed by Kathir and produced by K. T. Kunjumon. The film starred Vineeth and debutant Abbas in the main leads, along with actress Tabu (in her Tamil debut) while S. P. Balasubrahmanyam, Vadivelu, Chinni Jayanth and Srividya are featured in other pivotal characters. K. V. Anand was the cinematographer for the project and A. R. Rahman composed the film's soundtrack and score. The film opened on 23 August 1996 to positive reviews from critics and became a box office success. It was also remade in Bangladesh as Narir Mon, starring Riaz, Shakil Khan and Shabnur, respectively.

Plot
In Chennai, a traditional rivalry has always existed between the students of Pachaiyappa's and Loyola colleges. Karthik (Vineeth) is a poor orphan who studies in Pachaiyappa's College, a hobo in a rented room, travels by the bus, hangs out with a number of friends, and is the captain of his football team. He is also a good poet and daydreams about his dream girl. Arun (Abbas), on the other hand, comes from a rich and wealthy family, studies in Loyola College, drives his own car, hangs out with numerous friends, and is also the captain of his football team. In a nasty intercollege riot, Arun saves Karthik's life. So in return, Karthik lets Arun win in a soccer game because he thinks Arun can't take losses easily. Arun realizes that the victory is because of Karthik's sacrifice.

They become good friends, setting a good example of friendship to others in their college. Things go smooth until a new girl Divya (Tabu), joins the college. Both Arun and Karthik fall in love with her, but neither of them realizes that both are in love with the same girl. Following a sequence of events, when they realize that both are loving the same girl, their friendship is strained, and they fight with each other. At the end, Divya says that she likes them both but does not want to choose one, thereby losing the other and disrupting their friendship. Hence the film ends with Arun and Karthik regaining their friendship and remaining friends with Divya.

Cast

 Vineeth as Karthik
 Abbas as Arun 
 Tabu as Divya 
 S. P. Balasubrahmanyam as Divya's father
 Srividya as Divya's mother
 Vadivelu as Wilson
 Chinni Jayanth as Shiva
 Kevin Erik Gray as Kevin
 Joseph as Kevin's friend
 Adithya as Kevin's friend
 Yasin as Kevin's friend
 Dinesh as Kevin's friend
 Jyothi as Divya's lecturer
 Priyanka as Mary (uncredited role)
 Chaplin Balu as Wilson's friend (uncredited role)
 K. T. Kunjumon as Director general of police (cameo appearance)
 Vasudevan Baskaran as himself (cameo appearance)

Production

Development
Kathir, while writing the script, "wanted some drama rather than plain love and so wrote a story of warring colleges and two boys in them". He narrated a five-minute plot summary to Kunjumon, who was impressed with it and insisted Kathir to change the film's title to Kadhal Desam instead of its original title Kalloori Saalai.

Casting
Mumbai model Abbas was in Bangalore on vacation and hanging out at a cybercafe near Brigade Road, when he bumped into director Kathir, who asked him to act in his Tamil film. Initially reluctant due to his limited knowledge of Tamil, he opted out and left for Mumbai. A year later, Abbas received a call from producer K. T. Kunjumon asking him to come over for a screen test as a result of Kathir's insistence. Vineeth was signed on to play another lead role in the film due to his association with Kunjumon, having previously worked in the 1993 Shankar-directed film, Gentleman. Tabu was signed on to make her debut in Tamil films and worked on the film alongside Mani Ratnam's Iruvar. Then struggling actor Vikram had dubbed his voice for Abbas, while dubbing artist Sekar dubbed the voice for Vineeth and actress Saritha for Tabu. A. Karunakaran, who became a successful director in Telugu cinema, started his career as a clap assistant with this film.

Filming
Kathir mentioned that he dreamt of a "beautiful place full of young people" and was inspired by College Road in Chennai, with a setting by the beach which formed as "opening visual idea" for the film. Since it did not exist, he ordered it to be created for the film, costing Rs. one crore (ten million rupees). The film also managed to convince Pachaiyappa's College and Loyola College to give them rights to use their college names in the films, focussing on the rivalry between the institutions.  Filming mainly took place in and around the cities of Chennai, Bangalore, Ooty, Mudumalai, Bandipur, Mumbai and Vishakhapatnam.

Release
The film went on to become a large commercial success. The climax of the film broke a taboo in the Tamil film industry, where a love triangle would be decided with a happy ending. Post-success, Abbas revealed that he felt that "Mustafa Mustafa" song catapulted him to stardom and enjoyed a strong female base after Kadhal Desam. However, a critic from Indolink.com suggested that "Katheer's direction lacks the punch and innovation. The narration is slow, incoherent, and shaky", though mentioned there is "reasonably good acting by Vineeth, Abbas is OK for a newcomer and Tabu looks ravishing". A reviewer from The Hindu wrote "Grandiose trappings in the form of giant sets, never before erected on such a scale in an Indian movie, offer a  fitting backdrop for a love story.

The film won A. R. Rahman his fifth consecutive Filmfare Award for Best Music Director in Tamil. K. V. Anand also received the Screen Award South for Best Cinematography for his work in the film. The film was dubbed and released in Telugu as Prema Desam and became an equally big success. The Hindi dubbed version, Duniya Dilwalon Ki, however, released to negative reviews and did not perform as well.

The success of the film prompted Rahman to collaborate with Kathir again in Kadhalar Dhinam (1999) and Kadhal Virus (2002). As a result of respect for his first director, Abbas made a guest appearance in the latter film. The film triggered off a string of youth-based stories in films with Minsara Kanavu and Ullaasam featuring similar story lines.

Soundtrack

The soundtrack for the film was composed by A. R. Rahman, with lyrics by Vaali. The soundtrack was also released in Telugu as Prema Desam and in Hindi with the title Duniya Dilwalon Ki, with lyrics written by P. K. Mishra and Mehboob Kotwal.

Kathir revealed that the first song to be recorded was "Kalloori Saalai", he wanted it to be a fast number, but wanted it to start the song "with a melodious line". Rahman asked for a dummy lyric for it which started with "Inbathai karuvakkinal penn", which Vaali liked and retained it for the final cut as well.

For the song "Musthafa Musthafa", Kathir wanted a song on the lines of an old song "Paravaigal Meethu", which was about friendship. Rahman gave him the tune during a flight journey which Kathir liked it.

Tamil version

Telugu version

Hindi version

In popular culture
"Kalluri Saalai" and the instrumental theme of the song and flowers falling on the road was parodied in Thamizh Padam 2 (2018).

References

External links
 

1996 films
1990s Tamil-language films
Indian romantic action films
1990s buddy films
Indian buddy films
Films scored by A. R. Rahman
Films set in Chennai
Films shot in Chennai
Indian romantic drama films
Tamil films remade in other languages
Films shot in Mumbai
Films shot in Visakhapatnam
Films directed by Kathir
1990s romantic action films
1996 romantic drama films